The Trara mountain range is a mountainous region of Algeria located on the northwest coast of the country, with an average altitude of .

The Trara Mountains are a coastal range in the western extension of the Tell Atlas mountains. It represents, in the Tell Oranais, a mountainous block whose access is very difficult. This massif appears as a mountainous arch between the Mediterranean Sea to the north, the valley of the Wadi Tafna to the east, the Wadi Mouilah to the south and the valley of Wadi Kiss to the west which determines the Moroccan border.
This space represents a well-identified geographical entity in view of its rugged relief of east-west orientation running entirely north of the Wilayah of Tlemcen and the northwest of the Wilayah of Aïn Témouchent.

The vegetation of the massif is made up mainly of pines and cypresses.

References

Mountain ranges of Algeria